Gray Gables is a historic home located at Darlington, Harford County, Maryland.  It is an 1880s Queen Anne style frame house, featuring an irregular plan, projecting bays, steeply pitched multiple gables, and slate roofs.  It is an intact example of the early work of Walter Cope (1860–1902), a principal in one of Philadelphia's most important and prestigious architectural firms, Cope and Stewardson.

It was listed on the National Register of Historic Places in 1986.

References

External links
, including photo from 2005, Maryland Historical Trust website

Houses on the National Register of Historic Places in Maryland
Houses in Harford County, Maryland
Houses completed in 1885
Queen Anne architecture in Maryland
Darlington, Maryland
National Register of Historic Places in Harford County, Maryland